Alphense Zwemclub (in English: Alphense Swim Club), shortly AZC or Alphen is a Dutch water polo and swimming club from Alphen aan den Rijn. The club has competitive departments for sports like water polo, synchronized swimming, competitive swimming, and diving. Additionally AZC has an active youth with mini water polo for children from 7 years.

History 
The Alphense Swim Club was founded on March 17, 1926. The association participates to the KNZB.

The previous sponsor of AZC was Electrolux, which was built between 2005 and 2010 was released with the name Electrolux AZC. Other well-known sponsors from the past: Unique, Microlife, Intervam, Tarvo, Converse, Peter Langhout Travel, Hans Verkerk kitchens and Sprey Wood wood imports.

AZC is among the men in the Dutch water polo Premier League. The club has seven men's teams and several youth teams playing in the various water polo competitions.

The women's teams of AZC played between 2006 and 2012 in a community starts with the Gouwe from Waddinxveen. Since the 2012-2013 season they play again with a women's team under his own name in the league.

AZC is the association which in recent decades has dominated Dutch men's water polo since 1976 by dragging inside include 20 league titles and 21 national cups .

AZC was for years the main supplier of men's national team. AZC is the only association of Dutch soil that has lain several times in the final of the European gentlemen opposite include the Italian Pro Recco and Catalunya from Barcelona.

Titles & achievements

Domestic competitions 
Dutch League
 Winners (20): 1976-77, 1977–78, 1978–79, 1980–81, 1982–83, 1983–84, 1984–85, 1985–86, 1986–87, 1987–88, 1988–89, 1992–93, 1993–94, 1996–97, 1997–98, 1999-00, 2000–01, 2001–02, 2002–03, 2003-04
Dutch Cup (KZNB)
 Winners (19): 1977-78, 1978–79, 1980–81, 1981–82, 1982–83, 1983–84, 1984–85, 1986–87, 1987–88, 1988–89, 1989–90, 1990–91, 1992–93, 1993–94, 1995–96, 1999-00, 2000–01, 2002–03, 2004–05

European competitions 
LEN Champions League
 Runner-up (1): 1983-84
 4th place (1): 1981-82
LEN Cup Winners' Cup
 Runner-up (1): 1990-91

Famous (former) water polo players 
  Stan van Belkum
  Bjørn Boom
  Bobbie Brebde
  Ton Buunk
  Ed van Es
  John Jansen
  Gijs van der Leden
  Ruud Misdorp
  Eric Noordegraaf
  Remco Pielstroom
  Hans Parrel
  Hans Stam
  Joeri Stoffels
  Gijze Stroboer
  Kimmo Thomas
  Niels Zuidweg

External links
 Official website

1926 establishments in the Netherlands
Water polo clubs in the Netherlands
Sports clubs in Alphen aan den Rijn
Sports clubs established in 1926